KSOK-FM (95.9 FM) is a radio station broadcasting a variety hits format. Licensed to Winfield, Kansas, United States, the station serves southeast of the Wichita area. The station is currently owned by Doxa Wave LLC.

History
In January 2022, KSOK-FM flipped its format from country to variety hits branded as "95.9 Bob FM". The flip followed Doxa Wave LLC purchasing the station from Cowley County Broadcasting.

References

External links

SOK-FM
Adult hits radio stations in the United States
Bob FM stations
Radio stations established in 1995